Catherine Mary Buckton (née Williams, 1826-1904) was a British campaigner and writer. She was based in Leeds, UK, and strongly believed in the education of women, and promoted hygienic practices.

Biography 
Catherine Buckton was born in Stoke Newington and was one of nine children. Her father was a surgeon specialising in the treatment of cholera and a pioneer of public health reform. She married Joseph Buckton, a successful cloth merchant in 1848. Buckton became the first woman in Leeds to hold elected public office when she became a member of the Leeds School Board in 1873.

She wrote a number of books: 'Health in the House, 25 Lectures on Elementary Physiology In It's Application To The Daily Wants of Man and Animals Delivered To The Wives and Children of Working-Men in Leeds and Saltaire' (1876 ), 'Food and Home Cookery', 'Our Dwellings, Healthy and Unhealthy' (1885 ), 'Town and Window Gardening, Including the Structures, Habits And Uses Of Plants, A Course Of 16 Lectures' (1879), and 'Comfort and Cleanliness (1894 )'

Books 

 'Health in the House, 25 Lectures on Elementary Physiology In It's Application To The Daily Wants of Man and Animals Delivered To The Wives and Children of Working-Men in Leeds and Saltaire' (1876 ) 
This was based on a series of lectures given over a 2 year period to children aged between 10-13. She used Germ Theory to explain the risk of infection, and used anatomy and physiology as an aid to learning (page x, preface  ).

 'Town and Window Gardening, Including the Structures, Habits And Uses Of Plants, A Course Of 16 Lectures (Given Out Of School Hours to Pupil -Teachers And Children Attending The Leeds Board Schools)' (1879 ) 
Based upon a series of lectures given to children, includes an introduction to the scientific basis of gardening, as well as practical advice.

 'Our Dwellings, Healthy and Unhealthy (Addressed To Girls Attending The Leeds Board Schools' (1885 ) 
Aimed at girls aged 9 and above, written with explanations in basic science, and simple experiments to 'explain the nature of good and bad air, ventilation, and why we have fevers'.

References

Sources
 https://www.thoresby.org.uk/content/people/buckton.php

1826 births
1904 deaths
19th-century English women writers
19th-century English writers